The 1963–64 season was Port Vale's 52nd season of football in the English Football League, and their fifth season in the Third Division. Freddie Steele spent big on transfers, bringing in players such as Billy Bingham, Albert Cheesebrough, and Jackie Mudie. However it was a disappointing season in the league and a disaster financially. The highlights of the season came in the FA Cup, where Vale beat top-flight Birmingham City at St Andrew's, and drew 0–0 with Liverpool at Anfield.

Overview

Third Division
The pre-season saw manager Freddie Steele spend unprecedented sums of money – though Vale's spending was insignificant to the standard of many of their rivals. Steele brought in Northern Ireland international Billy Bingham from Everton for £15,000; Albert Cheesebrough from Leicester City for another £15,000; as well as Walsall's Tim Rawlings for £4,000. Chairman Tom Talbot approved of these signings despite the club's financial problems. The club also took a tour of Northern Ireland, though a friendly with Benfica (arranged to match rivals Stoke City's match with Real Madrid) was cancelled due to fixture congestion.

The season opened with a 1–0 defeat to Shrewsbury Town at Gay Meadow. This was followed with two victories, including a 4–1 win over Bristol City in which Tony Richards bagged a hat-trick. After another three poor away games came a 3–0 win over Brentford in which Cheesebrough scored a hat-trick, and a 4–0 win over nearby Crewe Alexandra in front of 17,118 fans. Richards sustained a bad leg injury in this win over Crewe. In the beginning of October, Steele bought winger Ron Smith from Crewe for £6,500. Vale improved as a consequence, and three successive victories followed, leaving Vale in fifth spot. However with Richards' return came a downturn in form, as Vale's impressive strikers failed to find the net in a run of one win in nine league games. This one win was a 1–0 victory over struggling Barnsley at Vale Park, though a subsequent pitch invasion by youths emphasised a growing hooligan culture that would plague the club and the sport itself for decades.

In November, Vale paid Stoke City £12,000 for both ex-Scotland striker Jackie Mudie and left-back Ron Wilson. The defeats kept coming, and so Steele experimented with a 4–2–4 formation, dropping Richards from the first eleven. Vale then went six league games unbeaten, including a 4–4 draw with Bristol Rovers at the Eastville Stadium. However a 1–0 home loss inflicted by Notts County sent Vale on a run of seven defeats and two draws in nine league games. By March the club was in a relegation battle, though results then began to go Vale's way. Only one defeat in their final eleven games ensured safety, as the season ended with a 5–0 drubbing of relegated Wrexham.

They finished in thirteenth place with 46 points, a poor finish for the money spent on transfers. Only 53 goals were scored, as Richards and Cheeseborough were affected with injuries, and Bingham struggled to find his footing in the third tier. Their 49 goals conceded was an excellent record though.

Finances
On the financial side, good attendance figures failed to prevent a massive loss of £42,650, which had come from a £45,567 deficit in transfer fees. A donation of the £19,867 from the Sportsmen's Association and the social club could not disguise the disaster of poor finances. The wage bill had also risen by 20% to over £40,000. Leaving the club were Colin Grainger to Doncaster Rovers and Terry Harkin to Crewe Alexandra for a £3,000 fee.

Cup competitions
In the FA Cup, Vale conquered Fourth Division Bradford City with a 2–1 win at Valley Parade. They then defeated Workington 2–1 in a 'slipshod affair'. The Third Round held First Division Birmingham City at St Andrew's. Three thousand of the 21,652 spectators were Vale fans, who 'sung and chanted their way through' a 2–1 victory. In the Fourth Round Vale were drawn against top-flight giants Liverpool at Anfield. The "Reds" had inflicted a 6–1 thrashing of Stoke on Boxing day, in an ominous sign of the challenge the "Valiants" faced. Vale achieved a goalless draw in front of 52,327 fans – 8,000 of them Vale supporters – in a fantastic team performance. The replay at Vale Park ended in a 2–1 loss in front of 42,179 paying fans (as well as an additional 6,000 or so Liverpool supporters who 'mob stormed' the gates to enter the Railway Paddock). Crowd trouble ate into the £8,000 worth of gate receipts, and more significantly caused the death of a Leek man (Harold Birch), and saw serious injuries inflicted to Liverpool fans Harry Taylor and James McDonough, as well as Vale supporter Billy Poulson.

In the League Cup, a First Round exit came with a 2–1 defeat at Southend United's Roots Hall.

League table

Results
Port Vale's score comes first

Football League Third Division

Results by matchday

Matches

FA Cup

League Cup

Player statistics

Appearances

Top scorers

Transfers

Transfers in

Transfers out

References
Specific

General

Port Vale F.C. seasons
Port Vale